Albion is the name of some places in the U.S. state of Wisconsin:
Albion, Dane County, Wisconsin, a town
Albion (community), Wisconsin, an unincorporated community
Albion, Jackson County, Wisconsin, a town
Albion, Trempealeau County, Wisconsin, a town